Alone Again (Naturally) is the thirtieth studio album by American pop singer Andy Williams, released in September 1972 by Columbia Records and mainly consisting of songs originated by other artists. For its release in the UK, the album was titled The First Time Ever (I Saw Your Face), and three of the songs were replaced with the 7-inch single tracks "Who Was It?" and "Marmalade, Molasses & Honey" and a recording that was not released on vinyl in the U.S., "If You're Gonna Break Another Heart".

The album made its first appearance on the Top LP's & Tapes chart in the issue dated September 30, 1972, and remained there for 18 weeks, peaking at number 86.

The only song on the album ever released as a single by Williams was "Home Lovin' Man", which had already had its chart run on Billboard magazine's list of the 40 most popular Easy Listening songs of the week in the U.S. back in 1970, when it reached number 10.  The song had also reached number seven on the UK singles chart by the end of that year.  Coinciding with its first North American release on a Williams LP, the same recording entered the Easy Listening chart again in the November 4, 1972, issue of Billboard and made it to number 27 during its five weeks there.

Alone Again (Naturally) was released on compact disc for the first time as one of two albums on one CD by Collectables Records on February 19, 2002, the other album being Williams's Columbia release from the fall of 1973, Solitaire.  Collectables included this CD in a box set entitled Classic Album Collection, Vol. 2, which contains 15 of his studio albums and two compilations and was released on November 29, 2002. The First Time Ever (I Saw Your Face) was paired with Solitaire as two albums on one CD by Sony Music Distribution in 2003.

Reception

In their capsule review for retailers, Billboard magazine wrote, "Chalk up another important chart item for Williams as he takes on some strong hits of today and adds his own fine touches to them." They singled out a few tracks in particular. “Along with the title tune, Williams delivers exceptional readings of 'Where Is the Love', 'Song Sung Blue', 'Amazing Grace' and 'I Need You'. His treatment of 'The Long and Winding Road' is also a gem."

Track listing

North American release
Side one
 "Pieces of April" (Dave Loggins) – 3:36
 "Day by Day" from Godspell (Stephen Schwartz) – 3:11
 "Where Is the Love" (Ralph MacDonald, William Salter) – 2:34
 "If I Could Go Back" from Lost Horizon (1973) (Burt Bacharach, Hal David) – 4:28
 "I Need You" (Gerry Beckley) – 2:58
Side two
 "Alone Again (Naturally)" (Gilbert O'Sullivan) – 4:04
 "The First Time Ever (I Saw Your Face)" (Ewan MacColl) – 3:19
 "Song Sung Blue" (Neil Diamond) – 3:05
 "Home Lovin' Man" (Roger Cook, Roger Greenaway, Tony Macaulay) – 3:10
 "The Long and Winding Road" (John Lennon, Paul McCartney) – 3:18
 "Amazing Grace" (John Newton) – 3:27

UK release
Side one
 "The First Time Ever (I Saw Your Face)" (MacColl) – 3:19
 "Pieces of April" (Loggins) – 3:36
 "Day by Day" (Schwartz) – 3:11
 "Where Is the Love" (MacDonald, Salter) – 2:34
 "If I Could Go Back" (Bacharach, David) – 4:28
Side two
 "I Need You" (Beckley) – 2:58
 "Alone Again (Naturally)" (O'Sullivan) – 4:04
 "Song Sung Blue" (Diamond) – 3:05
 "Who Was It?" (O'Sullivan) – 2:50
 "Marmalade, Molasses & Honey" from The Life and Times of Judge Roy Bean (Alan and Marilyn Bergman, Maurice Jarre) – 3:40
 "If You're Gonna Break Another Heart" (Albert Hammond, Mike Hazlewood) – 2:29

Recording dates
August 29, 1970 – "Home Lovin' Man"
June 12, 1972 – "I Need You", "The First Time Ever I Saw Your Face"
June 13, 1972 – "Alone Again (Naturally)", "The Long and Winding Road","Amazing Grace" 
 July 18, 1972 – "Pieces of April", "Day by Day", "Where Is the Love, "If I Could Go Back"
 1972 – "Song Sung Blue"
 September 16, 1972 – "Who Was It?"

Song information
The recording of "Pieces of April" by Three Dog Night peaked at number 19 on the Billboard Hot 100 and number six on the magazine's Easy Listening chart. "Day by Day", from the original cast album of the musical Godspell, reached number 13 pop and number eight Easy Listening.  The duet between Roberta Flack and Donny Hathaway entitled "Where Is the Love" got as high as number five pop and number 29 on the UK singles chart and spent a week at number one on the Easy Listening and R&B charts. The single also received Gold certification from the Recording Industry Association of America and earned Flack and Hathaway the Grammy Award for Best Pop Vocal Performance by a Duo, Group or Chorus. "If I Could Go Back" was written for the 1973 remake of Lost Horizon.

The band America reached number nine on the Hot 100 and number seven Easy Listening with "I Need You". "Alone Again (Naturally)" by Gilbert O'Sullivan peaked at number three in the UK and had six weeks at number one on the pop and Easy Listening charts; it also received Gold certification from the Recording Industry Association of America. "The First Time Ever (I Saw Your Face)" by Roberta Flack spent six weeks at number one on the Hot 100 and Easy Listening charts and reached number four R&B and number 14 UK. In addition to Gold certification by the RIAA, the song also earned Grammy Awards for Record of the Year for Flack and Song of the Year for songwriter Ewan MacColl.

Neil Diamond enjoyed a week at number one on the Hot 100 and seven weeks at number one on the Easy Listening chart with "Song Sung Blue", which also got as high as number 14 in the UK and received the RIAA's Gold award. The Beatles got to number one for two weeks on the Hot 100 and one week at number two on the Easy Listening chart with "The Long and Winding Road", which also received both Gold and Platinum certification. Judy Collins took "Amazing Grace" to number 15 pop number five Easy Listening, and number five UK.  The Pipes and Drums and the Military Band of the Royal Scots Dragoon Guards debuted their instrumental recording of the classic hymn in the UK first and enjoyed five weeks at number one there and made it to number 11 on the Hot 100 and number nine Easy Listening in the US.

"Who Was It?" was a number 23 hit on the UK singles chart for Hurricane Smith, who also took the song to number 49 pop and number 12 Easy Listening.
Williams' recording of "Marmalade, Molasses & Honey" originated in the 1972 film The Life and Times of Judge Roy Bean and received an Academy Award nomination for Best Original Song. "If You're Gonna Break Another Heart" was recorded by Cass Elliot for her 1972 album The Road Is No Place for a Lady and by Albert Hammond under the title "If You Gotta Break Another Heart" for his 1973 album It Never Rains in Southern California.

Personnel
From the liner notes for the original album:

Andy Williams - vocals
Dick Glasser - producer
Al Capps - arranger/conductor (except as noted)
Artie Butler - arranger/conductor ("Home Lovin' Man")
Eric Prestidge - remix engineer
Mike Ross-Trevor - recording engineer in London
Rafael O. Valentin - recording engineer
Tom Bert - back cover photo
Keats Tyler - front cover photo

Charts

References

Bibliography

1972 albums
Andy Williams albums
Albums produced by Dick Glasser
Columbia Records albums